Fred Minnick (born August 1, 1978) is an American author who has written seven books. He is noted for having a great whiskey palate, as he's a judge on the San Francisco World Spirits Competition, World Whiskies Awards and is the former lead American whiskey reviewer for Whiskey Advocate. Minnick has served as the Bourbon Authority for the Kentucky Derby Museum since 2013  and was the bourbon headliner for the inaugural Bourbon & Beyond Festival  and curated the Fireside Chats for the Forecastle Music Festival.

Career
Minnick's first article was published in his town's local newspaper, the Oklahoma County News, when he was just fifteen years old. After college, Minnick served as an Army journalist in Iraq from 2004 to early 2005. Minnick documented many combat operations. He reports on these and other prominent experiences in his book Camera Boy (Hellgate press, 2009) as well as overcoming post-traumatic stress disorder in 2005.

Minnick began professionally writing about wine and spirits in 2006 as a freelancer and has since written for The Tasting Panel, USA Today, Scientific American, New York Times, Stores Magazine, Parade Magazine, Caviar Affair, Whisky Advocate, Whisky Magazine, Sommelier Journal, Costco Connection, Bourbon Review, and Covey Rise. Minnick announced in early July 2018 in a blog post that he would no longer be writing for Whiskey Advocate. Later that month, he launched his own magazine, Bourbon +, as its editor-in-chief, along with founder and publisher John Thames. Bourbon + is a quarterly magazine that features high quality, in-depth coverage of all aspects of the bourbon industry. 

On July 11, 2017, Minnick published “Will Trump Kill the Bourbon Boom?” in the New York Times. Minnick discusses Trump's threat to impose tariffs on steel imports and how that will affect the bourbon industry. He also appeared on CBS This Morning and NPR. After the 25% Chinese tariff on whiskey went into effect in June 2018, Minnick further discussed the damage the state of Kentucky and the bourbon industry will suffer in the CNBC report “Whiskey wars: Trade tariffs hit hard in Trump country.”

Minnick has worked with Danny Wimmer Presents as the bourbon headliner for their Louisville, Ky based Bourbon & Beyond music festival since its debut in 2017. As the festival's Bourbon Headliner, Minnick curates over 30 workshops including tastings, discussions and historic panels. 

Bourbon Up with Fred Minnick was released on November 26, 2018, on the Amazon Prime Video platform. It is a vignette-style web series that features interviews conducted by Minnick with Bourbon legends such as Freddie Johnson, and master distillers Fred Noe and Jeff Arnett.

Speaking
Minnick is a frequent seminar presenter and emcee for drinks industry conferences, including San Antonio Cocktail Conference, Tales of the Cocktail (New Orleans), Thirst Boston, Whisky Live, Arizona Cocktail Week and Bourbon Classic. In addition, he regularly speaks at organizational conferences, such as Women Influencing Louisville, Culinary Historians of New York, Kentucky Bar Association, University of Kentucky's College of Agriculture, Decatur Book Festival, Western Kentucky University and many others.
Since 2013, Minnick has worked with the Kentucky Derby Museum to present the popular Legends Series of Bourbon.

List of Works
 Mead (Running Press, June 2018)
 Rum Curious (Voyager Press, June 2017)
 Bourbon: The Rise, Fall & Rebirth of an American Whiskey (Voyager Press, October 2016)
 Bourbon Curious: A Simple Tasting Guide for the Savvy Drinker (Zenith, August 2015)
 Whiskey Women: The Untold Story of How Women Saved Bourbon Scotch & Irish Whiskey (Potomac, October 2013)
 Camera Boy: An Army Journalist’s War in Iraq (Hellgate, 2009)
 The Brand That Changed Beef: Certified Angus Beef History (Wooster Book Company)
 Louisville Junior League Cookbook (Southwestern Publishing Group, January 2013)
 The Blog of War: Front-Line Dispatches from Soldiers in Iraq and Afghanistan (Simon & Schuster, September 2006)

Awards and Accolades
 Best New Spirits Book, Spirited Awards for Bourbon, 2017
 One of the Best Food Books of 2016, Smithsonian Magazine, 2016
 One of the Best Spirits Books Ever Written, Eater.com on Whiskey Women, 2017
 Gold Medal in the Women's Studies category for the 2013 Foreword INDIES for Whiskey Women
 Finalist, Pink Lady International Food Photographer of the Year, October 2012
 Commended (British for Honorable Mention), Errazuriz International Wine Photographer of the Year, May 2013
 Editorial Excellence, APEX May 2012, Awarded for "American Whiskey" by Fred Minnick in Tasting Panel Magazine
 Honorable Mention, American Society of Journalists & Authors, April 2013 for my Dallas Morning News OpEd, "A Soldier's Fight, One Fire at a Time"
 Finalist for Book of the Year, Spirited Awards, July 2014 for Whiskey Women. 
 Silver Medal in "Women's Issues," Independent Publisher Book Awards June 2014 for Whiskey Women

References 

1978 births
Living people
American food writers
American male journalists